Aphantaulax is a genus of ground spiders that was first described by Eugène Simon in 1878.

Species
 it contains seventeen species:
Aphantaulax albini (Audouin, 1826) (type) – Egypt, Ethiopia
Aphantaulax australis Simon, 1893 – South Africa
Aphantaulax cincta (L. Koch, 1866) – Europe, Turkey, North Africa, Israel
Aphantaulax ensifera Simon, 1907 – São Tomé and Príncipe
Aphantaulax fasciata Kulczyński, 1911 – Thailand, Indonesia (Java, Lombok)
Aphantaulax flavida Caporiacco, 1940 – Ethiopia
Aphantaulax inornata Tucker, 1923 – South Africa
Aphantaulax katangae (Giltay, 1935) – Congo
Aphantaulax rostrata Dankittipakul & Singtripop, 2013 – Thailand
Aphantaulax scotophaea Simon, 1908 – Australia (Western Australia)
Aphantaulax signicollis Tucker, 1923 – South Africa
Aphantaulax stationis Tucker, 1923 – South Africa
Aphantaulax trifasciata (O. Pickard-Cambridge, 1872) – Southern Europe, North Africa, Turkey, Israel, Caucasus, Russia (Europe) to Central Asia, China, Japan
Aphantaulax t. trimaculata Simon, 1878 – France
Aphantaulax univittata Thorell, 1897 – Myanmar
Aphantaulax voiensis Berland, 1920 – East Africa
Aphantaulax zonata Thorell, 1895 – Myanmar

References

Araneomorphae genera
Cosmopolitan spiders
Gnaphosidae
Taxa named by Eugène Simon